Brian McQueen (born 1 January 1991) is a Scottish footballer who plays as a central defender for St Roch's in the Scottish Junior Football Association, West Region. McQueen previously played for Hamilton Academical and Clyde, as well as Bo'ness United on loan.

Career
McQueen began his career with Hamilton Academical, making his professional debut on 21 February 2010. He moved on loan to Bo'ness in January 2011, before signing for Clyde in summer 2011.

After sustaining a knee injury in training, McQueen missed the majority of the 2015–16 season and after his release from Clyde in the summer of 2016, he joined Junior side St Roch's.

Career statistics

References

1991 births
Living people
Scottish footballers
Hamilton Academical F.C. players
Bo'ness United F.C. players
Clyde F.C. players
St Roch's F.C. players
Scottish Premier League players
Scottish Football League players
Scottish Professional Football League players
Scottish Junior Football Association players
Association football central defenders